Kathleen Flaherty may refer to:

Kathleen Flaherty (camogie), All-Ireland Senior Camogie Championship 1960 
Kathleen Flaherty, character in Best Friends Together